Godfrey Baniau (born 28 February 1977) is a Papua New Guinean footballer who plays as a goalkeeper. He has won one cap for the Papua New Guinea national football team.

Baniau was first called up to the national team in 2004.

Honours
Madang
Papua New Guinea FA Cup: 2003

References

External links

1977 births
Living people
Papua New Guinean footballers
Papua New Guinea international footballers
Association football goalkeepers
Hekari United players
People from Tanga Islands
People from Namatanai
People from New Ireland Province
People from Madang Province
2012 OFC Nations Cup players